Stefan Vekić (born 26 April 1995) is a Serbian sprint canoeist.

He participated at the 2018 ICF Canoe Sprint World Championships.

References

1995 births
Serbian male canoeists
Living people
ICF Canoe Sprint World Championships medalists in kayak
Sportspeople from Novi Sad
European Games competitors for Serbia
Canoeists at the 2019 European Games
Competitors at the 2018 Mediterranean Games
Mediterranean Games competitors for Serbia
21st-century Serbian people